Gouda may refer to:
 Gouda, South Holland, a city in the Netherlands
 Gouda (pottery), style of pottery manufactured in Gouda
 Gouda cheese, type of cheese originally made in and around Gouda
 Gouda railway station
 Gouda, Western Cape, a small town in South Africa with a name of Khoisan origin
 Gōda, a Japanese surname
 Emperor Go-Uda (1265–1324), emperor of Japan
 Gouda rabbit, a breed of rabbit

See also 
 
 
 Gauda (disambiguation)
 Goda (disambiguation)
 Gowda (disambiguation)